Northeast Ohio College Preparatory School is a K-12 charter school serving 606 students in Cleveland, Ohio.

Charter schools are popular in Cleveland. Thirty-one percent of public school students in the city of Cleveland attend charter schools. Only ten cities in the United States have a higher percentage of students in charter schools.  Ninety-two percent of students in New Orleans attended charter schools in 2015-2016.

History

The school building, built in 1949, was originally St. John Cantius High School, closed in 1988.  The building later housed charter school I Can School Professor Avenue.

In May 2016, teachers at the school voted to unionize, joining the American Federation of Teachers. The Center for Education Reform estimates that ten percent of charter school teachers belong to a union.

In March 2017, Accel Schools took over the charter management contract for Northeast Ohio College Preparatory School and six other I Can schools.

Athletics
The school offers basketball and volleyball. The basketball team competes in the Division III Garfield Heights tournament, but is ineligible for the 2018-2019 year.

References

External links 
Annual Report 2016-2017 
Management contract 

Education in Cleveland
High schools in Cuyahoga County, Ohio
Public high schools in Ohio
Charter schools in Ohio